One by One is an album by the American soul music group the Impressions, released in 1965. It consists mostly of cover songs, with only a few originals.

Track listing
"Twilight Time" (Artie Dunn, Al Nevins, Buck Ram, Morty Nevins) - 2:17
"I Wanna Be Around" (Johnny Mercer, Sadie Vimmerstadt) - 2:15
"Nature Boy" (eden ahbez) - 2:24
"Just One Kiss from You" (Curtis Mayfield) - 2:37
"I Want to Be with You" (Lee Adams, Charles Strouse) - 3:17
"Answer Me, My Love" (Fred Rauch, Carl Sigman, Gerhard Winkler) - 2:43
"It's Not Unusual" (Gordon Mills, Leslie Reed) - 2:20
"Without a Song" (Edward Eliscu, Billy Rose, Vincent Youmans) - 3:18
"Falling in Love with You" (Mayfield) - 2:56
"My Prayer" (Georges Boulanger, Jimmy Kennedy) - 2:58
"Mona Lisa" (Jay Livingston, Raymond Evans) - wrongly credited to Sallie M. Sefrit and Mana Zucca - 2:28
"Lonely Man" (Mayfield) - 2:43

Personnel
The Impressions
Curtis Mayfield – lead vocals, guitar
Fred Cash – background vocals
Sam Gooden – background vocals
with:
The Funk Brothers – instrumentation
The Boston Symphony Orchestra – instrumentation
Johnny Pate – producer, arrangements, conductor

Charts
USA - Album

USA - Singles

References

1965 albums
The Impressions albums
ABC Records albums
Albums produced by Johnny Pate